See You Later is an album by Vangelis.

See You Later may also refer to:

 "See You Later", a song by Heatmiser from Mic City Sons
 "See You Later", a song by Soul Asylum from Candy from a Stranger
 "See you later", an informal parting phrase.

See also
 "See You Later Alligator", a song by Bill Haley & His Comets
 See You Later, Alligator (novel), a novel by William F. Buckley, Jr.
 See Ya Later Gladiator, a 1968 Looney Tunes animated short
"See U Later", a song by Blackpink from Square Up